The Stralsund Highflyer is a breed of fancy pigeon developed over many years of selective breeding. Stralsund Highflyers, along with other varieties of domesticated pigeons, are all descendants from the rock pigeon (Columba livia).

History
The breed emerged in Pomerania, where Stralsund is located, and was developed from the French Cumulet.

See also
 List of pigeon breeds

References

Pigeon breeds
Pigeon breeds originating in Germany